José António "Tó" Alves Ferreira (born 24 August 1971) is a Portuguese former footballer who played as a goalkeeper.

Club career
In a professional career that lasted 22 years, Porto-born Ferreira played mainly in the second and third divisions of his country.

In the Primeira Liga his totals consisted of ten games for F.C. Famalicão over the course of two seasons, eight with S.C. Beira-Mar in 1994–95 – with relegation – and three with S.C. Salgueiros in the 2001–02 campaign (with his team also dropping down a tier).

International career
Ferreira represented Portugal at the 1991 FIFA World Youth Championship, played in Lisbon. He appeared in the third group stage match for the eventual winners, keeping a clean sheet against South Korea (1–0 win).

References

External links

1971 births
Living people
Footballers from Porto
Portuguese footballers
Association football goalkeepers
Primeira Liga players
Liga Portugal 2 players
Segunda Divisão players
F.C. Famalicão players
Amora F.C. players
S.C. Beira-Mar players
C.D. Aves players
F.C. Penafiel players
S.C. Salgueiros players
Associação Naval 1º de Maio players
G.D. Chaves players
S.C. Espinho players
S.C. Dragões Sandinenses players
U.D. Oliveirense players
Gondomar S.C. players
Boavista F.C. players
U.S.C. Paredes players
Portugal youth international footballers
Portugal under-21 international footballers